Sea Lake is a town in the Mallee district of north-west Victoria, Australia and is situated on the southern shores of Lake Tyrrell. Sea Lake is in the heart of Australia's wheat belt, and is the main township for a number of wheat farms in the region.

History
The site upon which Sea Lake is situated was first visited by colonists in 1838.  Sea Lake may have been given its name by an early settler, Edward Eyre, from the Port Phillip area.  Purportedly, the sea-like appearance of Lake Tyrrell inspired Eyre.  An alternative version of the naming of Sea Lake comes from a surveyors report of the time when planning the township (which lies to the south of Lake Tyrrell).  It is purported that a surveyor mistook a mark on hand drawings "see lake" which had been used by the author of the drawings to mark a landmark.

Much of the time, Lake Tyrrell is dry. However, the lake is occasionally fed by Tyrrell Creek. There is a salt extraction plant located in Sea Lake, processing the lake's salt deposits.

A community was established after the arrival of the Kulwin railway line in 1893. The post office opened on 2 October 1895.

The Sea Lake Magistrates' Court closed on 1 January 1983.

Sea Lake has a rich grain farming history and one of the first recorded stations in the area is Tyrrell Downs.

The "Sea Lake", a body of fresh water south of Lake Tyrrell, was described in 1893 as "an assured and ample water supply" for the proposed Wycheproof to Mildura Railway. 
It supplied the town and surrounding farms which grew up around it,    but in poor seasons it dried up. 
Alternate water was arranged, and the golf course now occupies the former Sea Lake.

Local interest
Sea Lake is located in fairly close proximity to several major national parks, including Wyperfeld National Park and Hattah-Kulkyne National Park. The town of Sea Lake is known for its once-yearly rally car race called the Mallee Rally, held on the Queens Birthday holiday in June and for its silo art. Sea Lake's main newspaper is called the Times Ensign. The paper was established in 1897.

With its neighbouring townships Culgoa, Berriwillock and Nandaly, Sea Lake has football and netball teams (Sea Lake Nandaly Tigers) competing in the North Central Football League.

Golfers play at the course of the Sea Lake Golf Club.

The township has one hotel, the Royal Hotel (locally known as the Top Pub) and two motels: Lake Tyrrell Accommodation and the Thisledome Motel. A visitors centre is located on Main Street.

At least two local footballers have played at VFL/AFL level. Geoff McMillan (Nandaly) played for Richmond in 1978–79 and Greg Daniels (Sea Lake) played for Collingwood in 1986.

To the south of Sea Lake (some ) lies the fresh water lake - Green Lake. This lake has served the surrounding communities well over the years for water sports recreation and as a holiday retreat. The lake was at its hey day in the 70s particularly when many speed boats and families spent hot summers at the lake. The lake is part of a natural depression and is fed by water by channel. It was dry for many years but around 2009 it was refilled.

Sea Lake also have a Cricket side with the neighboring town Woomelang forming the Sea Lake Woomelang Cricket Club.

Flora, fauna, and environment
The Mallee fowl is found in Sea Lake. The region has been suffering from the effects of a long running drought now for many years.

References

External links

 Sea Lake, Victoria community website
The Sea Lake Mallee Rally on Australia's official tourism site
Encyclopædia Britannica entry about Sea Lake
Encyclopædia Britannica entry about Lake Tyrrell
Sea Lake Woomelang Inc. Cricket Club

Towns in Victoria (Australia)
Mallee (Victoria)